Claxton is a surname. Notable people with the surname include:

Adelaide Claxton (fl. 1860–1890s), British artist, illustrator, and inventor
Brooke Claxton (1898–1960), Canadian veteran of World War I
Charles Robert Claxton (1903–1992), English Bishop
Florence Claxton (1838–1920), British artist
Gavin Claxton (born 1966), British screenwriter, producer and director 
Janis Claxton (1964–2018), Australian choreographer
Jimmy Claxton (1892–1970), Canadian Afro-American baseball pitcher 
Kate Claxton (1848–1924), American actress
Marshall Claxton (1811–1881), English artist
Nic Claxton (born 1999), American basketball player
Patricia Claxton (born 1929), Canadian translator
Philander Claxton (1862–1957), American educator
Rozelle Claxton (1913–1995), American jazz pianist 
Sarah Claxton (born 1979), English athlete
Speedy Claxton (born 1978), American basketball player
Thomas Claxton (doorkeeper) (died 1821), Doorkeeper of the United States House of Representatives
Thomas Claxton (1790–1813), officer in the United States Navy during the War of 1812
William Claxton (photographer) (1927–2008), American photographer
William Gordon Claxton (1899–1967), Canadian World War I ace pilot